"Mary Mack" ("Miss Mary Mack") is a clapping game of unknown origin. It is first attested in the book The Counting Out Rhymes of Children by Henry Carrington Bolton (1888), whose version was collected in West Chester, Pennsylvania. It is well known in various parts of the United States, Australia, Canada, United Kingdom and in New Zealand and has been called "the most common hand-clapping game in the English-speaking world".

In the game, two children stand or sit opposite to each other, and clap hands in time to a rhyming song.

The same song is also used as a jumprope rhyme, although rarely so according to one source.

Rhyme
Various versions of the song exist; a common version goes;

Miss Mary Mack, Mack, Mack
All dressed in black, black, black
With silver buttons, buttons, buttons
All down her back, back, back (or "Up and down her back, back, back")

She asked her mother, mother, mother
For 50 cents, cents, cents
To see the elephants, elephants, elephants
Jump over the fence, fence, fence 

They jumped so high, high, high
They reached the sky, sky, sky
And didn't (or never) come back, back, back (or come down, down, down)
Till the 4th of July ly ly

Alternate versions use "15 cents", "never came down" and end with repeating "July, July, July".

An alternate version, sung in Canada, includes the words:

She could not read, read, read
She could not write, write, write
But she could smoke, smoke, smoke
Her father’s pipe, pipe, pipe

An alternate version, sung in the American South:

Mary Mack,
Dressed in black,
Silver buttons all down her back.
She combed her hair
And broke the comb
She's gonna get a whoopin' when her Momma comes home
Gonna get a whoopin' when her Momma comes home

Clap
A common version of the accompanying clap is as follows:
pat arms across chest: Arms across chest
pat thighs: Pat thighs
clap hands: Clap hands
clap right hands together: Clap right palms with partner
clap left hands together: Clap left palms with partner
clap both hand together
 Clap both palms with partner
Another version:
&: One palm up, one palm down
4: Clap both partners hands
&: Clap own hands
1: Cross arms to chest
2: Slap thighs
3: Clap own hands
Another Version:
4: Pat thighs
&: Clap hands
1: Clap partners right hand
&: Clap hands
&: Clap partners left hand
&: Clap hands
2: Clap both partners hands
&: Clap hands
Another Version:
&: One palm up, one palm down
1: Clap both partners hands
&: Reverse hands
2: Clap both partners hands
&: Clap own hands
4: clap partners right hand
&: clap hands
5: clap partners left hand
&: clap hands
6: clap partners right hand
&: clap hands
repeat

Possible origins
The song may have originated from the Southern United States, but those claims are disputed due to lack of evidence. Miss Mary Mack was a performer in Ephraim Williams’ circus in the 1880s, and the song may be reference to her and the elephants in the show.

The first verse,  the repetition, is also a riddle with the answer "coffin".

Early mentions of the part about the elephant do not include the part about Mary Mack.

See also
"DemiRep" – a song from the punk rock band, Bikini Kill, which includes "Mary Mack"
"Tobacco Origin Story" – a poem by Joy Harjo, refers to the song
 with lyrics based on "Mary Mack"
 with a reference to "Mary Mack"

References

American folk songs
English children's songs
Traditional children's songs
Songs about fictional female characters
Clapping games
Skipping rhymes